The 1910 Tower Hamlets St George by-election was a Parliamentary by-election. It returned one Member of Parliament (MP) to the House of Commons of the United Kingdom, elected by the first past the post voting system. It was held on 1 March 1910.

Vacancy
The by-election was caused due to the incumbent Liberal MP, William Wedgwood Benn, becoming a Commissioner of the Treasury, requiring him to seek re-election.

Electoral history
The seat had been Liberal since Benn gained it in 1906. Benn easily held the seat at the January 1910 election, with a reduced majority;

Candidates
The local Liberal Association re-selected 33-year-old Wedgwood Benn to defend the seat. 
The Conservatives retained Percy Coleman Simmons as their candidate.

Campaign
Polling Day was fixed for the 1 March 1910.

Result
The Liberals held the seat and managed a slightly increased majority;

Aftermath
Benn was re-elected at the general election 9 months later.

References

Tower Hamlets St George by-election
Tower Hamlets St George by-election
Tower Hamlets St George,1910
Tower Hamlets St George,1910
Tower Hamlets St George by-election